This is a list of the National Register of Historic Places listings in Grand Canyon National Park.

This is intended to be a complete list of the properties and districts on the National Register of Historic Places in Grand Canyon National Park, Arizona, United States.  The locations of National Register properties and districts for which the latitude and longitude coordinates are included below, may be seen in a Google map.

There are 23 properties and districts listed on the National Register in the park, seven of which are National Historic Landmarks.

Current listings

|}

See also 
 National Register of Historic Places listings in Coconino County, Arizona
 List of National Historic Landmarks in Arizona
 National Register of Historic Places listings in Arizona

References